This list is of the Places of Scenic Beauty of Japan located within the Prefecture of Shiga.

National Places of Scenic Beauty
As of 1 July 2021, twenty-two Places have been designated at a national level.

Prefectural Places of Scenic Beauty
As of 1 May 2020, eighteen Places have been designated at a prefectural level.

Municipal Places of Scenic Beauty
As of 1 May 2020, a further seventeen Places have been designated at a municipal level.

Registered Places of Scenic Beauty
As of 1 July 2021, three Monuments have been registered (as opposed to designated) as Places of Scenic Beauty at a national level.

See also
 Cultural Properties of Japan
 List of parks and gardens of Shiga Prefecture
 List of Historic Sites of Japan (Shiga)

References

External links
  Cultural Properties in Shiga Prefecture

Tourist attractions in Shiga Prefecture
Places of Scenic Beauty

ja:Category:滋賀県にある国指定の名勝